A Chilote cap (Spanish: gorro chilote) is a knitted cap typical of Chiloé Archipelago. The caps are made of coarse raw wool and usually have a  pom-pon (Chilote Spanish  bellota, "acorn") at the top. The designs and colours of the cap may vary but are usually naturally coloured horizontal stripes over the natural garn.

While the cap is associated with Chiloé, where many Chilote caps sold in the market are woven, it is popular all over Chile, especially among field labourers such as fishermen, farmers and forestry workers. 

Chiloé Archipelago
Chilean clothing
Caps